Threepence may refer to:

 Threepence (Irish coin), a pre-decimalisation coin
 Threepence (Australian), a pre-decimalisation coin
 Threepence (British coin), a pre-decimalisation coin

See also
 Twopence (disambiguation), or tuppence
 Five pence (disambiguation)
 Sixpence (disambiguation)
 Ten pence (disambiguation) 
 Twenty pence (disambiguation) 
 British twenty-five pence coin 
 Fifty pence (disambiguation) 
 Three-cent piece, a United States coin